The Red Grass is a 1950 novel by the French writer Boris Vian, published by Éditions Toutain.

See also
 1950 in literature
 20th-century French literature

References

1950 French novels
Novels by Boris Vian
Red